Safford is an unincorporated community in Dallas County, Alabama.

Benjamin F. Gibson (1931–2021), United States District Court judge, was born in Safford.

Safford is located at the intersection of State Route 5 and State Route 22 and is the western terminus of SR 22 which extends eastward to the Georgia state line.

References

Unincorporated communities in Alabama
Unincorporated communities in Dallas County, Alabama